was a Japanese agricultural economist, widely considered to be an authority on the subject. He was a Rockefeller fellow at Iowa University, a winner of Purple Ribbon Medal and a Lifetime member of the International Association of Agricultural Economists. He is credited with the development Hayami Development Economics, an agricultural philosophy on the relationship of a community to the market and the state. He died on 24 December 2012.

Biography 
Professor Yujiro Hayami was born on 26 November 1932 in Tokyo, Japan. His college education was at the Faculty of Liberal Arts, University of Tokyo, from where he graduated in 1956. He continued his education as a research associate at the National Research Institute of Agricultural Economics, Ministry of Agriculture, Forestry and Fisheries, Ngoyo, Japan, but a year later, moved to the Department of Economics and Sociology, University of Iowa from where he obtained his PhD in 1960.

Career 
Professor Hayami started his career in 1966, as an Associate Professor, Faculty of Economics at Tokyo Metropolitan University where he worked till 1986. In between, he was also a visiting associate professor of agricultural economics at the University of Minnesota from 1968 to 1970 and Agricultural Economist at the International Rice Research Institute in the Philippines from 1974 to 1976. In 1986, he joined the School of International Politics, Economics and Business, Aoyama Gakuin University, Tokyo where he worked as the professor of Economics till 2000 when he was made the Director of the Foundation for Advanced Studies on International Development (FASID) till his death on 24 December 2012. Professor Hayami was also a visiting T. H. Lee Professor of World Affairs Chair, Cornell University from 1995 to 1996.

The major achievements credited to Yujiro Hayami are:
 A research conducted at the International Rice Research Institute (IRRI) in the Philippines, that led to the Green Revolution on high yielding varieties of rice.
 Development of a new stream of academics called Hayami Development Economics which focusses on the relationship between the community, market and the state.

He is also credited with redefining the discipline of agricultural economics with special emphasis on economic development of the developing countries, focusing on the issues related to income distribution and the environmental problems faced by the developed countries.

Awards and recognitions 
 Fukuoka Academic Prize – 2001
 Purple Ribbon Medal – 1999
 Honorary Lifetime Member from the International Association of Agricultural Economists – 1997
 Nikkei Prize for excellent books in Economic Science – 1996
 Honorary Fellow, American Agricultural Economics Association – 1991
 NIRA Tohata Memorial award for policy studies, the National Institute for Research Advancement- 1987
 Nikkei Prize for excellent books in Economic Science – 1973
 Rockefeller Fellow at the University of Iowa

Books and publications
 
 
 
 
 
 

He has also written many articles and working papers, counting more than 70, which are in circulation worldwide.

References

External links
 Yujiro Hayami on Good Reads
 Yujiro Hayami on Amazon
 Yujiro Hayami on Economic and Political Weekly
 Extract on Oxford Journals
 Yujiro Hayami on Barnes & Noble
 on French Wikipedia
 on Research Gate

Agricultural economists
Japanese economists
University of Tokyo alumni
University of Iowa alumni
Academic staff of National Graduate Institute for Policy Studies
1932 births
2012 deaths